The Xiaomi Mi A2 Lite is a budget smartphone developed by Xiaomi, a global version of the company's Redmi 6 Pro, co-developed by Google as part of its Android One project.

Specifications

Hardware 
The phone features a 5.84 inches Full HD+ (1080 x 2280 pixels resolution) 432ppi pixel density display, semi-metal body. It is powered by a Qualcomm Snapdragon 625 processor along with Adreno 506 GPU and has a 2.0 micro USB connector. It has a dual rear camera (Primary camera is 12MP sensor of 1.25μm pixel size and f2.2 aperture and Secondary has 5MP sensor of 1.12μm pixel size with f2.2 aperture). The front camera is 5MP sensor of f2.0 aperture. The battery is of 4000 mAh.

Software 
The Xiaomi Mi A2 Lite is part of the Android One program, where software updates are provided directly from Google.

It is preinstalled with Android 8.1.0 "Oreo" out of the box, and can be upgraded to Android 10.

Being a part of Android One program, Mi A2 Lite provides a Stock Android experience and UI which is very close to those of Google Pixel UI.

Release 
The Xiaomi Mi A2 Lite is a re-branded Xiaomi Redmi 6 Pro phone. It was released in July 2018.

References 

Android (operating system) devices
Mobile phones introduced in 2018
Phablets
Mobile phones with multiple rear cameras
Xiaomi smartphones
Mobile phones with infrared transmitter
Discontinued smartphones